Seyfabad-e Muqufeh (also Romanized as Seyfābād-e Mūqūfeh; also known as Seyfābād) is a village in Gevar Rural District, Sarduiyeh District, Jiroft County, Kerman Province, Iran. At the 2006 census, its population was 21, in 6 families.

References 

Populated places in Jiroft County